Wop is a pejorative slur for Italians.

Wop or WOP may also refer to:
"Wop" (song), a song by J. Dash
WOP!, a 2016 album by Lil' Kleine
Worcestershire Parkway railway station, National Rail station code WOP
World of Padman, a computer game
World-Over Press, an information agency established by Devere Allen and his wife
WOp (or WOP), a WWII era abbreviation for a wireless operator
Wojska Ochrony Pogranicza, border protection troops in communist-era Poland

People
Wop Drumstead (1898–1946), American football player
Wop May (1896–1952), Canadian flying ace in World War I